Neopaney/Neupane or Nyaupaneor Hindi (हिन्दी- न्यूपाने) a surname found mainly in Nepal and in significant communities in India and Bhutan. It belongs predominantly to Brahmin (Bahun) and Kshatriya (Chhetri) of Nepal and Indian territories of Sikkim, Darjeeling, Varanasi, Uttar Pradesh, Uttarakhand, Assam, Meghalaya and some are up to Bhutan and Myanmar. They belong to Kanyakubja Brahmin family of  Pancha-Gauda Brahmans following Kaudilya/Kaudinya gotra, names after Sage Kaudilya.

Notable people with the surname Neopaney/Neupane/Nyaupane/Nepane
 Amar Neupane, Nepali writer
 Kedar Neupane, Nepali politician
 Kedar Nath Neupane (1927–1971), Nepali educator and author
 Mukunda Neupane, Nepali trade unionist and politician
 Yogmaya Neupane (1860–1941), 
Nepali religious leader, women's rights activist and poet
Tapan Neopaney (2000-present) 
Nepali Standup comedian, and a great entertainer from Sikkim.

References

Surnames of Nepalese origin
Nepalese people
Khas surnames